The Tanzania national netball team is the national netball team of Tanzania. As of 1 July 2015, they are currently not ranked in the INF World Rankings. The current team members are below.

Players

Head coaches

References

National netball teams of Africa
Netball
Netball in Tanzania